The 1995/96 FIS Ski Flying World Cup was the 6th official World Cup season in ski flying awarded with small crystal globe as the subdiscipline of FIS Ski Jumping World Cup.

Calendar

Men

Standings

Ski Flying

Nations Cup unofficial

References 

World cup
FIS Ski Flying World Cup